Kim Yong-shik (Korean: 김용식; November 11, 1913 – March 31, 1995) was a South Korean lawyer and diplomat.

Personal life
Kim's younger brother was Korean author Kim Yong-ik. He graduated from the Law College of Chuo University in Tokyo in 1937.

Career
He twice served as Foreign Minister of South Korea (in 1962 and from 1971 to 1973) and also held the posts of National Unification Minister (1973–1974) and Minister without Portfolio (1963). Kim's diplomatic career began with posts as Consul in Hong Kong and Honolulu, and progressed with assignments as Minister of the South Korean embassies to Japan (1951–1957) and France (May 16, 1957 – September 10, 1958), and then Minister with the Korean mission in Geneva. He then became Ambassador to Great Britain, concurrently to the Scandinavian countries (1961–1962), to the Philippines (1962–1963), to the United Nations, concurrently Canada (1964–1970), and to the United States (1977–1981). He was also special assistant to the President of the Republic of Korea for Foreign Affairs (1970–1971).

Upon his retirement from the foreign service, Kim took the posts of President of the Republic of Korea National Red Cross, Chairman of the Committee for Promotion of Home Visits by Overseas Koreans, Chairman of the Committee for Commemoration of the 100th Anniversary of Korean US Relations.

References

1913 births
1995 deaths
Ambassadors of South Korea to Canada
Ambassadors of South Korea to the Philippines
Ambassadors of South Korea to the United Kingdom
Ambassadors of South Korea to the United States
Presidents of the Organising Committees for the Olympic Games
Chuo University alumni
Permanent Representatives of South Korea to the United Nations
Foreign ministers of South Korea